Pitcairnia insularis is a plant species in the genus Pitcairnia. This species is endemic to Brazil.

References

insularis
Flora of Brazil